Acylfulvene is a class of cytotoxic semi-synthetic derivatives of illudin, a natural product that can be extracted from the jack o'lantern mushroom (Omphalotus olearius).  One important acylfulvene, 6-hydroxymethylacylfulvene (irofulven), has been evaluated for the treatment of a wide assortment of cancers and tumors.  It is thought that acylfulvene compounds kill cancer cells by DNA alkylation (see DNA methylation).

References

Enones
Tertiary alcohols
Spiro compounds
Cyclopropanes